Elections to Croydon Council in London, England were held on 7 May 1998. The whole council was up for election and the Labour Party stayed in overall control of the council. For the first time in a local election two polling stations were situated in supermarkets.

Before the election the council had been seen as a top target for the Conservatives who only needed a small swing of 2 percent to take control. The Labour party had taken control of the council for the first time in the council's history in the previous election in 1994. The removal of mounted patrols from parks and an increase in nursery places were seen as important issues in the election. Both main parties concentrated on trying to get their vote out and were targeting several key wards.

Election result

Ward results

Addiscombe

Ashburton

Bensham Manor

Beulah

Broad Green

Coulsdon East

Croham

Fairfield

Fieldway

Heathfield

Kenley

Monks Orchard

New Addington

Norbury

Purley

Rylands

Sanderstead

Selsdon

South Norwood

Spring Park

Thornton Heath

Upper Norwood

Waddon

West Thornton

Whitehorse Manor

Woodcote & Coulsdon West

Woodside

References

1998
1998 London Borough council elections